Military occupations of France may refer to

Sixth Coalition occupation of France (1814)
Seventh Coalition occupation of France (1815–1818), under the command of the Duke of Wellington
Prussian occupation of northern France during the Franco-Prussian War (1870–1871) and afterwards (1871-1873) as a guarantee of the payment of war reparations
Imperial German occupation of north-east France during World War I (1914–1918)
Nazi German military administration in occupied France during World War II (1940–1944)
Italian occupation of France during World War II (1940–1943)

See also
Military Administration in Belgium and Northern France
Italian occupation of Corsica (1940–1943)
Zone occupée (occupied zone) in parts of western and northern France, administered by the Militärverwaltung in Frankreich
Zone libre (free zone) in parts of southern France, where the rump state known as Vichy France was established until occupied in 1942
Zone interdite (forbidden zone) may refer either to the zone with restricted access to civilians along the Atlantic coast or the zone forbidden for refugees to return to
Alsace-Lorraine during World War II

Occupations